Ilam University Farm ( – Mazra‘eh-ye Āmūzshī Dānshgāh Īlām) is a village in Mohsen Ab Rural District, in the Central District of Mehran County, Ilam Province, Iran. At the 2006 census, its population was 104, in 13 families.

References 

Populated places in Mehran County